ADÑ–Spanish Identity (Spanish: ADÑ–Identidad Española), also known as FE de las JONS–Alternativa Española–La Falange–Democracia Nacional, is a Spanish political coalition created for the 2019 European Parliament election.

The eurosceptic coalition is formed by the far-right parties FE de las JONS, Alternativa Española, La Falange and National Democracy.

History 
In October 2018 the political parties La Falange, Spanish Alternative, National Democracy and Falange Española de las JONS announced that they would take part in the 2019 European Parliament election as a coalition named ADÑ Spanish Identity.

In 30 of April 2019, the candidature was proclaimed by the Junta Electoral Central, with the name FE de las JONS-Alternativa Española-La Falange-Democracia Nacional, with the acronym ADÑ (Ante Todo España, in english: Above All Spain).

Composition

Ideology 
The coalition takes inspiration in the aesthetic and ideology of other "identitarian" parties in Europe, wanting to take electoral advantage of the Euroscepticism, the suspicion in the PP and the fear to a change in the demographic composition of the country. The party wants to leave the Eurozone and take back "national sovereignty". It also wants to restrict immigration.

Election results

European Parliament

References 

Falangist parties
Far-right political party alliances in Spain
Fascist parties in Spain
Political parties established in 2018
2018 establishments in Spain